The 2015 Pan American Cross Country Cup took place on February 22, 2015.  The races were held at Avenida al Río in Barranquilla, Colombia. 

Detailed reports were given.

Complete results were published.

Medallists

Race results

Senior men's race (10 km)

Junior (U20) men's race (7 km)

Senior women's race (7 km)

Junior (U20) women's race (5 km)

Medal table (unofficial)

Note: Totals include both individual and team medals, with medals in the team competition counting as one medal.

Participation
According to an unofficial count, 183 athletes from 21 countries participated.

 (2)
 (1)
 (1)
 (14)
 (22)
 (7)
 (19)
 (7)
 (5)
 (12)
 (1)
 (15)
 (9)
 (2)
 (13)
 (22)
 (3)
 (1)
 (20)
 (2)
 (5)

See also
 2015 in athletics (track and field)

References

Pan American Cross Country Cup
Pan American Cross Country Cup
Pan American Cross Country Cup
Pan American Cross Country Cup
Cross country running in Colombia